Edwin Hillyer was an American industrialist from Waupun, Wisconsin. Hillyer first came to Waupun in 1847, eight years after Seymour Wilcox, the settlement's founder.

Life 
Edwin Hillyer was born in Ohio on September 30, 1825. Edwin, along with his brother, Joseph Talcott Hillyer, settled in Waupun in 1847. When they first arrived, both of them worked in lumber. In 1849, Edwin and eight other Waupun settlers came down with gold fever and formed a company to travel to California. They all returned in 1852.

Civic Life 
Hillyer was heavily connected to several early Waupun industries. When he returned from California, he engaged in a store business with his brother before he sold his share a few years later. He and others established the Dodge County Mutual Insurance Company, and Hillyer worked there for the entirety of its existence. In 1856, he played a major role in constructing the Milwaukee & Horicon Railroad between Waupun and Horicon. Hillyer was also a leader in the formation of the Forest Mound Cemetery.

For a time, Hillyer was the deputy warden at the Wisconsin State Prison. It was also he who directed the landscaping in front of the original building.

Hillyer had also served in the Assembly for the 6th Wisconsin Legislature. He ran as a Democrat.

Waupun Public Library 
The Waupun Library Association was established in 1858 through the efforts of Hillyer and William Euen. Hillyer was the first librarian and ran the library out of his insurance office. When it began, the library only had nine feet of shelving. In 1895, citing his advanced age and the job's strenuous work, he turned the book stock over to the city. When the city took ownership of the library, the mayor appointed a new library board which included Hillyer and Lucius D. Hinkley, another prominent Waupun industrialist. He was involved in the 1904 construction of the Carnegie Library in Waupun. Hillyer served on the board until his death.

Military service 
When the Civil War broke out in 1861, Hillyer raised part of two companies for the Wisconsin Volunteer Infantries. Company D. of the 3rd and Company K. of the 10th. He was appointed captain of Company K. He served until he fell ill in 1863 and resigned from his post. He was honorably discharged from the military.

Death and legacy 
Edwin Hillyer died at the age of 83 on December 8, 1908. He was buried in Forest Mound Cemetery in Waupun.

References 

1908 deaths
People from Ohio
People from Waupun, Wisconsin
People of Wisconsin in the American Civil War
People of the California Gold Rush
Businesspeople from Wisconsin
1825 births
19th-century American businesspeople